The term Bulgarian-Serbian War or Serbian-Bulgarian War may refer to:

 Bulgarian-Serbian War (839-842)
 Bulgarian-Serbian War (853)
 Bulgarian-Serbian wars (917-924)
 Bulgarian-Serbian War (1330)
 Bulgarian-Serbian War (1885)
 Bulgarian-Serbian War (1913), during the Second Balkan War
 Bulgarian-Serbian War (1915-1918), during the First World War
 Bulgarian-Serbian War (1941-1944), during the Second World War

See also
 Bulgarian-Serbian wars in the Middle Ages
 Toplica Uprising
 Bulgarian occupation of Serbia (disambiguation)
 Serbian Uprising (disambiguation)
 Serbian-Turkish War (disambiguation)